Joseph Brady Mitchell (September 25, 1915 – February 17, 1993) was an American military historian.

He served for 18 years in the U.S. Army and achieved the rank of lieutenant colonel.

Books
Decisive Battles of the American Revolution 
Decisive Battles of the Civil War 
Discipline and Bayonets: The Armies and Leaders in the War of the American Revolution 
Twenty Decisive Battles of the World 
Military Leaders of the Civil War
The Badge of Gallantry: Recollections of Civil War Congressional Medal of Honor Winners

References

1915 births
1993 deaths
United States Army officers
Historians of the American Civil War
20th-century American historians
American male non-fiction writers
20th-century American male writers